This is a list of electoral district results for the 1963 Queensland state election.

This election saw the return of preferential voting after first past the post voting was in effect for elections from 1944 to 1960.

Results by electoral district

Albert

Ashgrove

Aspley

Aubigny

Balonne

Barambah

Barcoo

Baroona

Belmont

Bowen

Brisbane

Bulimba

Bundaberg

Burdekin

Burke

Burnett

Cairns

By-election 

 This by-election was caused by the death of Watty Wallace. It was held on 27 February 1965.

Callide

Carnarvon

Chatsworth

Clayfield

Condamine

Cook

Cooroora

Cunningham

Fassifern

Flinders

Greenslopes

Gregory

Gympie

Hawthorne

Hinchinbrook

Ipswich East

Ipswich West

Isis

Ithaca

Kedron

Kurilpa

Landsborough

Lockyer

Logan

Mackay

Mackenzie

Maryborough

Merthyr

Mirani

By-election 

 This by-election was caused by the death of Ernie Evans. It was held on 15 May 1965.

Mount Coot-tha

Mount Gravatt

Mourilyan

Mulgrave

Murrumba

Norman

Nudgee

Nundah

Port Curtis

Redcliffe

Rockhampton North

Rockhampton South

Roma

Salisbury

Sandgate

Sherwood

Somerset

South Brisbane

South Coast

Tablelands

Toowong

Toowoomba East

Toowoomba West

Townsville North

Townsville South

Warrego

Warwick

By-election 

 This by-election was caused by the death of Otto Madsen. It was held on 19 October 1963.

 Preferences were not distributed.

Wavell

Whitsunday

Windsor

Wynnum

Yeronga

By-election 

 This by-election was caused by the death of Winston Noble. It was held on 6 June 1964.

See also 

 1963 Queensland state election
 Candidates of the Queensland state election, 1963
 Members of the Queensland Legislative Assembly, 1963-1966

References 

Results of Queensland elections